Thornton Lodge is a suburb of Huddersfield, West Yorkshire. It borders Crosland Moor to the west, Lockwood to the south, and Longroyd Bridge to the north.  It mostly comprises suburban housing and some small shops, with industrial units around the area bordering Longroyd Bridge.

Geography

History

Thornton Lodge was originally a country manor that belonged to the Thornton family of Yorkshire who had owned properties in the area since at least 1686.

Community

The modern population is primarily composed of second and third-generation Indian and Pakistani families.

Infrastructure

The major employers within this area are involved in the clothing, textile, and engineering industries.

The nearest rail services are available at Lockwood railway station.

See also
Listed buildings in Crosland Moor and Netherton

References

External links
  Map location
 Aerial photo

Colne Valley
Areas of Huddersfield